
Bieszczady County is a unit of territorial administration and local government (powiat) in Subcarpathian Voivodeship, in the extreme south-east of Poland, on the border with Ukraine. It takes its name from the Bieszczady mountain range. The county was created on January 1, 1999, as a result of the Polish local government reforms passed in 1998. In 2002 the western part of the county was split off to form Lesko County.

As of 2019 its total population is 21,799, of which the population of Ustrzyki Dolne is 9,097, and the rural population is 12,702. Its average population density of 19.0 persons per square kilometre (50.0 per square mile) makes it the least densely populated county in Poland.

The county includes the greater part of Bieszczady National Park (Bieszczadzki Park Narodowy), and of the Polish part of the UNESCO-designated East Carpathian Biosphere Reserve.

Neighbouring counties
Bieszczady County is bordered by Lesko County to the west and Przemyśl County to the north. It also borders Ukraine to the east and south.

Administrative division
The county is subdivided into three gminas (one urban-rural and two rural). These are listed in the following table, in descending order of population.

References

Rural landscape picture

 
Bieszczady